Premendra Mitra (4 September 1904 – 3 May 1988) was an Indian poet, writer and film director in the Bengali language. He was also a practitioner of Bengali science fiction. His critique of humanity led him to believe that for it to survive, human beings had to "forget their differences and be united".

Birth and family
Premendra Mitra was born on 4 September 1904 at his father's workplace Varanasi. His ancestral house was at Rajpur in the district of South 24 Parganas of West Bengal. He belonged to the renowned Mitra family of Konnagar (in Hooghly district, West Bengal). His father's name was Gyanendranath Mitra and his mother was Suhasini Debi. He lost his mother at an early age.

Life
Premendra Mitra was born in Varanasi, India where his father Gyanendranath Mitra was an employee of the Indian Railways and because of that he had the opportunity to travel to many places in India. Having lost his mother, who died during his childhood, he was brought up by his grandparents in Uttar Pradesh and spent his later life in Calcutta (now Kolkata) and Dhaka. He was a student of South Suburban School (Main) and enrolled for a BA at the Scottish Church College in Calcutta which he left prematurely to study agriculture in Santiniketan with a friend of Rabindranath Tagore, Leonard Elmhirst. Because it did not hold his interest, he returned to education first on an undergraduate course in Dhaka and in 1925 at Asutosh College in Calcutta where he assisted the research of Dinesh Chandra Sen. In particular, his creation of the character of GhanaDa [ঘনাদা] (meaning: 'Elder brother Ghana' in Bengali) won him public recognition.

Bibliography

Poems 
Prothoma (First Lady)
Somrat (The Emperor)
Feraari Fouj  (The Lost Army) Poetries:Fhyan [ফ্যান]
Sagor Theke Fera (Returning From The Sea)
Horin Cheeta Chil (Deer, Cheetah, Kite) Poetries: Khunt [খুঁত] (Wrong)
Kokhono Megh (An Occasional Cloud)
Ananya (One-of-a-kind, Unique)
Khuda wahid (Allah)

Short story collections

Bengali 
PonchoShor [পঞ্চশর] (The Five Arrows)
Benami Bandar [বেনামি বন্দর] (Unknown Harbour)
Putul O Protima [পুতুল ও প্রতিমা] (Doll And Clay Image of Goddess)
Mrittika [মৃত্তিকা] (Earthen image)
Ofuronto [অফুরন্ত] (Endless)
Dhuli Dhusor [ধূলি ধূসর] (Fade As Dust)
Mohanagar [মহানগর] (The Great City)
Jol Payra (Water Pigeon)
Sreshto Golpo [শ্রেষ্ঠ গল্প] (Best Stories)
Nana Ronge Bona [নানা রঙে বোনা] (Knit with Different Colours)
Nirbachita [নির্বাচিত] (Selected)
Telenapota Abishkar [তেলেনাপোতা আবিষ্কার] (Discovering Telenapota)

English 
(Not actually written by him, later translated)
Snake And Other Stories
Mosquito and Other Stories
Adventures of Ghanada

For children 
MayurPankhi [ময়ূরপঙ্খী]
SagorDanri [সাগরদাঁড়ি]
MakorMukhi [মকরমুখী]

Rhymes 
Hariye [হারিয়ে]
Borong [বরং]
Misti Megh [মিষ্টি মেঘ] (A Sweet Cloud)
Onko [অঙ্ক] (Mathematics)
Misti [মিষ্টি] (Sweet)
Duti Banshi [দুটি বাঁশি] (The Two Flutes)
Megher Ghurhi [মেঘের ঘুড়ি] (The Kite of Cloud)

Fairy tales, ghost stories and teenager stories 
Chorui Pakhira Kothay Jay [চড়ুই পাখিরা কোথায় যায়]
Lighthouse-e [লাইটহাউসে] (At the Lighthouse)
Satyabadi Suku [সত্যবাদী সুকু] (Suku the Truth Speaker)
Hatir Danter Kaj [হাতির দাঁতের কাজ] (Work Done By the Tooth of an Elephant)
Golper Swarge [গল্পের স্বর্গে] (At the Paradise of Stories)
Putuler Lorai [পুতুলের লড়াই] (The Fight of the Dolls)
Ramrajye Bidroha [রামরাজ্যে বিদ্রোহ]
Kurukshetre Bhaja Orfe Brihaddhaja [কুরুক্ষেত্রে ভজা ওরফে বৄহদ্ধজ] (Bhaja Alias Brihaddhaja at the Kurukshetra)
Ratan Panjali [রতন পাঞ্জালী]
Ko-Aai [কো-আই]
Porira Keno Ase Na [পরিরা কেন আসে না] (Why the Fairies Don't Come)
KalRakkhos Kothay Thake?  [কালরাক্ষস কোথায় থাকে?] (Where does KalRakkhos Live?)
Sanu O DudhRajkumar [সানু ও দুধরাজকুমার] (Sanu And DudhRajkumar)
KaluSardar (Kalu the Leader)
Gopon Bahini [গোপন বাহিনী] (The Secret Force)
Mahuri Kuthite Ek Rat [মাহুরি কুঠিতে এক রাত] (One Night Stand at Mahuri Kuthi)
Nishutipur [নিশুতিপুর]
Vuturhe Jahaj [ভূতুড়ে জাহাজ] (The Ghost Ship)

Ghost stories 
Golper Sheshe (At the End of the Story)
Rajputanar Morute (At the Desert of the Rajputana)
Bromhadoityer Math (The Ground of Bromhadoityo (Ghost)

Fun stories 
Clue [ক্লু] (The Clue)
Chor [চোর] (The Thief)
Bhupaler Kopal [ভূপালের কপাল] (The Fate of Bhupal)
BishwomvorBabur Bibortonbad [বিশ্বম্ভরবাবুর বিবর্তনবাদ] (The Thesis of Evolution by BishwomvorBabu)
Niruddesh [নিরুদ্দেশ] (Missing Person)

Science fictions 
He was among the pioneers of Bengali science fiction. He started writing science fictions to make children and preteens familiar with science.
Juddho Jakhan Thamlo [যুদ্ধ যখন থামল] (When the War Stopped)
Pinpre Puran [পিঁপড়ে পুরাণ] (The Story of the Ants)
Prithivir Shatru [পৄথিবীর শত্রু] (The Enemies of the Earth)
Kalapanir Atole [কালাপানির অতলে]
Mangalbairi [মঙ্গলবৈরী] (The Martian Enemies)
Koral Korkot [করাল কর্কট] (Horrible Crab)
Akasher Atonko [আকাশের আতঙ্ক] (The Danger from the Sky)
Manusher Protidwondi [মানুষের প্রতিদ্বন্দ্বী] (The Rival of the Man)
MoyDanober Dweep [ময়দানবের দ্বীপ] (The Island of MoyDanob)
Shomaoner Ron(g) Sada [শমনের রং সাদা] (The White Coloured Death)
Shukre Jara Giyechhilo [শুক্রে  যারা গিয়েছিল] Those Who Went to Venus; previously named as Prithibee Chhariye [পৃথিবী ছাড়িয়ে] (Beyond the Earth)

Novels 
Paank (The Mud)
Michhil  (The Procession)
Uponayon (The Ceremony)
Protishod  (The Revenge)
Kuasha (The Fog)
Protidhwoni Fere (Echo Returns)
Haat Baralei Bondhu
Ora Thake Odhare
Path Bhuley
Dabi

Characters

Ghanada

Ghanada (Original name: Ghanashyam Das) is a middle-aged resident of a mess at 72, Banamali Naskar Lane in Kolkata, West Bengal with the four young members Shibu, Shishir, Gour and Sudhir (the narrator of the stories). He claims himself to be full of thrilling experience all over the globe (and, even in Mars!) to tackle conspiracies. Also, some of the stories are about Ganado (Original name: Ghonoram Das [ঘনরাম দাস]) in South America, and Bachanram Das [বচনরাম দাস] in Agra at Medieval India, his ancestors. First Ghanada story was মশা  (The Mosquito) published in 1945.

Mamababu
Mamababu (Maternal Uncle) lived in Burma on account of his service. Original name of this middle-aged man is never stated. His expeditions are written in many novels and short-stories, such as:
Kuhoker Deshe (In the Land of Illusion)
Dryagoner Nishwas (The Breath of the Dragon)
Mamababur Protidan (The Refund of Mamababu)
Abar Sei Meyeti (That Girl Again)
Paharer Nam Korali (The Hill Named Korali)
This character inspired Sunil Gangopadhyay to write his famous Kakababu series.

Parashor Barma

Parashor Barma is a detective but he tries to be a poet. First Parashor story is Goyenda Kobi Parashor [গোয়েন্দা কবি পরাশর] (Detective Poet Parashor) in 1932. Some other stories are:
Hippie Songe Parashor Barma [হিপি সঙ্গে পরাশর বর্মা] (Parashor Barma in Hippie Company)
Cluber naam kumati [ক্লাবের নাম কুমতি] (Club named Kumati)
Nilem daklo parashor Barma [নিলেম ডাকলো পরাশর বর্মা] (Parashor called an auction)
Premer Chokhe Parashor [প্রেমের চোখে পরাশর] (Parashor in the Eye of Love)
Parashor Barma O Bhanga Radio [পরাশর বর্মা ও ভাঙ্গা রেডিও] (Parashor Barma and the Broken Radio)
Parashor Barma O Ashlil Boi [পরাশর বর্মা ও অশ্লীল বই] (Parashor Barma and the Book of Vulger)Parashor Ebar Johuri [পরাশর এবার জহুরি]

Two Ghanada tales also include Parashar Barma : Parasharey Ghanaday and Ghanada Phirlen.

Mejokorta
Mejokorta is a ghost-hunter. Books featuring Mejokorta are collected in an anthology named Bhoot Shikari Mejokorta Ebong...Publishers of Mitra's writings

Leela Majumdar translated several Ghanada tales in a volume called Adventures of Ghanada.
The latest English translation of his Ghanada stories (Mosquito and Other Stories) was published by Penguin Books India in 2004.

Filmography
DirectionSamadhan [সমাধান] (The Solution) Bengali,1943Bideshini [বিদেশিনী] (The Foreigner Lady) Bengali, 1944Path Bendhe Dilo [পথ বেঁধে দিল] (The Way Is Closed) Bengali, 1945.Rajlakshmi [राजलक्ष्मी] Hindi, 1945.Notun Khobor [নতুন খবর] (New News) Bengali, 1947: Starred by Dhiraj Bhattacharya. Story, Screenplay by Mitra.Kalo Chhaya [কালো ছায়া] (Black Shadow) Bengali, 1948: Starred by Dhiraj Bhattacharya.
Kuasha (1949) [কুয়াশা] (The Fog) Bengali, 1949: Based on his own novel, starring Nripati Chattopadhyay.Kankantala Light Railway 1950Setu 1951
Hanabari [হানাবাড়ি] (The Haunted House) Bengali, 1952: A Dhiraj Bhattacharya and Nabadwip Halder starred film, where the mystery of a terrible creature in a haunted building was solved by a detective in disguise of a beggar. This movie was also produced by Mitra.Dui Biye [দুই বিয়ে়] (Two Marriages) Bengali, 1953: Nripati Chattopadhyay and Dhiraj Bhattyacharya acted.Moyla Kagaj [ময়লা কাগজ] (The Dirty Paper) Bengali, 1954: Cast by Anil Chatterjee and Nripati Chattopadhyay.Dakinir Char [ডাকিনীর চর] (The Island of Witch) Bengali, 1955Chupi Chupi Aashey [চুপি চুপি আসে] (Silently He Comes) Bengali, 1960; an uncredited adaptation of Agatha Christie's 'The Mousetrap'.

Story, screenplay, lyrics and dialoguesBhabikaal [ভাবী কাল] (The Future) Bengali, 1945 – Story: Directed by Niren Lihiri.Avijog [অভিযোগ] (The Complain) Bengali, 1947 – Story, Screenplay, Lyrics: Directed by Shushil Majumder.Digvranto [দিগভ্রান্ত] (The Lost Destination) Bengali, 1950 – Story, Screenplay: Directed by Shushil Majumder.Ora Thake Odhare [ওরা থাকে ওধারে] (They Live That Side) Bengali, 1954 – Story, Screenplay, Lyrics: This funny movie is based on contemporary Ghati'' [ঘটি] and Bangal বাঙাল disputes of fifties. Starred by Uttam Kumar, Suchitra Sen, Bhanu Bandyopadhyay, Tulsi Chakrabarti, Chhabi Biswas and Dhiraj Bhattacharya. Directed by Sukumar Dashgupta.

References

External links
 

Bengali writers
Bengali-language writers
20th-century Bengali poets
Bengali Hindus
20th-century Bengalis
Bengali-language poets
Bengali film directors
Bengali novelists
Bengali male poets
1904 births
1988 deaths
Bengali detective fiction writers
Bengali-language science fiction writers
Indian male writers
Indian film directors
Indian novelists
Indian male novelists
Indian short story writers
Indian male short story writers
Indian poets
Indian male poets
Indian children's writers
Indian science fiction writers
Indian horror writers
Indian fantasy writers
Indian comedy writers
Scottish Church College alumni
University of Calcutta alumni
Recipients of the Rabindra Puraskar
Recipients of the Sahitya Akademi Award in Bengali
Recipients of the Padma Shri in literature & education
20th-century Indian novelists
20th-century Indian writers
20th-century Indian poets
20th-century Indian male writers
20th-century Indian short story writers
20th-century Indian film directors
Poets from West Bengal
Writers from Kolkata
Writers from Varanasi
Novelists from Uttar Pradesh
Novelists from West Bengal
Film directors from West Bengal
Film directors from Uttar Pradesh